Tharamangalam block  is a revenue block of Salem district of the Indian state of Tamil Nadu. This revenue block consist of 17 panchayat villages. They are,
 Alagusamudram
 Amaragundhi
 Ariyampatti
 Arurpatti
 Desavilakku
 Duttampatti
 Edayapatti
 Elavampatti
 Karukkalvadi
 Kurukkupatti
 Mallikuttai
 Manathal
 Panikkanur
 Pappampadi
 Ramireddipatti
 Selavadai
 T. Konagapadi

References 

Revenue blocks of Salem district